is a Japanese business man. of the Liberal Democratic Party, a member of the House of Representatives in the Diet (national legislature). A native of Kobe, Hyogo and graduate of the University of Tokyo, she ran unsuccessfully for the House of Representatives in 2004 as a member of the Democratic Party of Japan. She ran again, this time as a member of the LDP, in 2005 and was elected for the first time.

References

External links 
  in Japanese.

Living people
1970 births
People from Kobe
University of Tokyo alumni
Koizumi Children
Female members of the House of Representatives (Japan)
Members of the House of Representatives (Japan)
Democratic Party of Japan politicians
Liberal Democratic Party (Japan) politicians
21st-century Japanese women politicians